Netechma anterofascia is a species of moth of the family Tortricidae. It is found in Peru.

The wingspan is 19 mm. The ground colour of the forewings is cream, suffused with ferruginous. The hindwings are cream, tinged with brownish at the apex area and strigulated (finely streaked) with grey.

Etymology
The species name refers to the presence of the only anterior fascia of the forewing markings.

References

Moths described in 2010
Netechma